A role in sociology is a set of behaviours conceptualised by people in a social situation.

Role or roles may also refer to:

Role (performing arts), a character or part played by a performer or actor

Places
Role, Lublin Voivodeship, eastern Poland
Role, Pomeranian Voivodeship, northern Poland
Role, West Pomeranian Voivodeship, north-western Poland

Other uses
Rholes, or Roles, a tribal leader in Scythia Minor c. 31–27 BC

See also

 Thematic role (disambiguation)
 Role theory, a perspective in sociology
 Roles (surname)